Paroniria is a medical condition involving an excess of morbid dreams and nightmares.

Paroniria is suspected to have many causes, including fear, stress, depression, trauma, and sleep deprivation, among others. It may also be caused by the effects of antihistamines.

References

Parasomnias